Syed Mohammed Mukhtar Ashraf (Urdu:) (born on 4 August 1916 CE; 4 Shawwal 1334 AH) well known as Sarkar E Kalan (Urdu:)  or Makhdoon ul Mashaikh (Urdu:) was an Indian Sufi saint, spiritual leader, Islamic Scholar of Ahle Sunnah of the Ashrafi sufi order from Ashrafpur Kichhauchha, Uttar Pradesh, India. He was the Sajjada nashin of Dargah Ashraf Jahangir Semnani, founder of the Ashrafi Sufi Order. Syed died on 21 November 1996 in Ashrafpur Kichhauchha and is buried near dargah of Ashraf Jahangir Semnani.

Early life
Syed was born on 4 August 1916 CE, according to Islamic calendar he was born on 4 Shawwal 1334 AH in Kichhauchha Sharif. He was the son of Sufi Syed Ahmed Ashraf and descendent to Ashraf Jahangir Semnani, founder of the Ashrafi Movement.

Education
He completed his primary Islamic education at Kichhauchha Sharif after he began learning Dars-i Nizami from Maulana Imaduddin Wasi Ahmad Sasarami, Maulana Abdur Rashid Nagpuri and Hazrat Maulana Naimuddin Muradabadi Ashrafi.

Successor 
His grandfather Aala Hazrat Ashrafi Miyan nominated him as his Vali Ahad and Spiritual successor at Khanqahe Ashrafia Hasania, Kichhauchha Sharif on the occasion of Arbaʽeen of his deceased son Syed Ahmed Ashraf.

Shrine and Urs
His shrine is located near the tomb (dargah) of Ashraf Jahangir Semnani at Kichhauchha Sharif, Ambedkar Nagar, Uttar Pradesh, India. His Urs (demise anniversary) is commemorated on 9 Rajab 1417 AH.

See also
 Hashmi Miya

References

Indian muftis
Indian Sufis
Sunni imams
Critics of Shia Islam
Hanafi fiqh scholars
Indian Sunni Muslim scholars of Islam
Muslim reformers
Scholars from Uttar Pradesh
Indian Sunni Muslims
Indian Sufi saints
People from Ambedkar Nagar district
Sufi poets
Sufi mystics
Sufi teachers
20th-century Indian Muslims
1996 deaths
1934 births